Kezhen Peak, also known as Karpogo Sar, is a mountain in the Karakoram mountain range. It is located in the Xinjiang Autonomous Region of China.

See also
List of mountains in China
List of Ultras of the Western Himalayas

References

Mountains of Xinjiang
Seven-thousanders of the Karakoram